Cornelius "Lefty" Augustus (September 17, 1905 - March 30, 1981) was a baseball pitcher in the Negro leagues. He played with the Memphis Red Sox in 1927 and the St. Louis Stars in 1937.

References

External links
 and Seamheads

Memphis Red Sox players
St. Louis Stars (1937) players
1905 births
1981 deaths
Baseball pitchers
Baseball players from Mississippi
20th-century African-American sportspeople